Gilson Monteiro Varela da Silva, known as Gilson (born 12 May 1990) is a Cape Verdean football player who plays for União Santarém.

Club career
He made his professional debut in the Segunda Liga for Oriental on 15 August 2015 in a game against Vitória Guimarães B.

On 11 July 2018, Varela signed with Bulgarian club Etar.

Career statistics

Club

International career
Varela made his debut for the Cape Verde national football team in a 2-0 2019 Africa Cup of Nations qualification loss to Tanzania on 16 October 2018.

References

External links
 

1990 births
Living people
Sportspeople from Praia
Footballers from Santiago, Cape Verde
Cape Verdean footballers
Cape Verde international footballers
Cape Verdean expatriate footballers
SC Vianense players
G.D. Vitória de Sernache players
União Montemor players
Casa Pia A.C. players
Clube Oriental de Lisboa players
Sport Benfica e Castelo Branco players
C.D. Pinhalnovense players
S.C. Espinho players
SFC Etar Veliko Tarnovo players
Geylang International FC players
SC São João de Ver players
Liga Portugal 2 players
Campeonato de Portugal (league) players
First Professional Football League (Bulgaria) players
Association football forwards
Cape Verdean expatriate sportspeople in Spain
Cape Verdean expatriate sportspeople in Portugal
Cape Verdean expatriate sportspeople in Bulgaria
Cape Verdean expatriate sportspeople in Singapore
Expatriate footballers in Spain
Expatriate footballers in Portugal
Expatriate footballers in Bulgaria
Expatriate footballers in Singapore